Volunteering Matters is a UK charity focused on "the advancement of citizenship and community development for the public benefit through the promotion of volunteering". It was founded in 1962 as Community Service Volunteers (CSV) by Mora and Alec Dickson. In the 2018/2019 financial year, Volunteering Matters engaged around 20,000 volunteers through its hundreds of voluntary projects across England, Scotland and Wales.

As of 2021, the president of Volunteering Matters is Lord Freud. He succeeded Lord Levy, who had been President from 1999, in 2019. The charity is led by a Trustee Board headed by Anne Heal. Its Chief Executive since 2019 is Paul Reddish.

History 
In 1958, Dr Alec Dickson founded Voluntary Service Overseas (VSO) which focused on international volunteering projects. After leaving VSO, in 1962, Dickson and his wife Mora Dickson formed Community Service Volunteers, which focused on UK-based volunteer projects.

Elisabeth Hoodless was appointed Assistant Director of CSV in 1963, becoming the only paid staff member, since the founding director Alec Dickson (1914–1994), and his wife, Maura, were volunteers. Hoodless became CSV's Deputy Director in 1972 and Executive Director in 1975, a role she held until 2011.

In 1995, CSV launched Make A Difference Day, billed then as the UK's biggest day of volunteering aiming to "create a wave of kindness throughout the UK - to bring people together…and help build stronger, happier and safer communities". Make a Difference Day also exists in the USA.

In 1996, CSV began offering Employee Volunteering Programs.

Oonagh Aitken, who had been with CEO since 2012, became CEO in October, 2014. She had led the organisation through a significant transformation which resulted in CSV becoming Volunteering Matters in April, 2015. 

Paul Reddish became CEO in July, 2019 moving from ProjectScotland. In January, 2021, the trustees of Volunteering Matters and ProjectScotland agreed for both charities to merge. The charities announced that the two brands would continue to operate under one charitable organisation. Both brands would continue their existing programmes and current volunteers and the people they support would not be directly affected by the proposed merger.

In June, 2021, Reddish rode 1000km by bicycle from Edinburgh to London via Wales with his father Paralympian Tim Reddish to say "thank you" to people across the UK who volunteered in their communities during COVID19.

Programs
Around 20,000 people volunteer with Volunteering Matters each year from various demographics and backgrounds. 

Volunteering Matters pioneered the idea of teaching citizenship in schools  – it became part of the National Curriculum in England in 2002.

Projects include RSVP, Active Volunteering, Choices, Sporting Chance, Sex Matters Too, Lifelines, Grandmentors for volunteers over 50 years of age, Volunteers Supporting Families as well as befriending projects to assist older, young and disabled people.

They also have a journalist network through which journalists can volunteer their skills to non-profit organisations who need promotional help. Additionally, Volunteering Matters Action Desks work in partnership with the BBC at 36 BBC local radio stations. They broadcast appeals for volunteers, run awareness campaigns and promote Lifelong Learning.

Employee volunteering
In 1995, what was then CSV began providing volunteering opportunities for the staff of UK companies. The programme has continued and now involves fifty UK-based companies participating in activities that include one-off team building days through to long-term partnerships with local charities and schools.

Full-time volunteering
Volunteering Matters runs full-time volunteer projects across the UK, where volunteers are provided with accommodation and a weekly food and essentials budget. A full-time placement can last between 6 and 12 months, although it is sometimes possible to extend a placement after this date.

Part-time volunteering
Each year Volunteering Matters involves thousands of part-time volunteers throughout the UK.

Institute for Advanced Volunteer Management (IAVM) 
The IAVM was a training event held each year from 1998 to 2012 by Volunteering Matter's predecessor CSV. A three-day residential training event, it was focused on raising the standard of volunteering management. The IAVM had an international faculty drawn from Australia, Canada, the UK and USA. Core faculty included Arlene Schindler, Susan J Ellis, Rick Lynch, Steve McCurley and later Linda Graff and Martin J Cowling. Guest faculty included Andy Fryar, Fraser Dyer and Jayne Cravens. 

The IAVM was seen as significant by the sector for the impact it made on volunteering managers across the UK. It also served as a model for other similar training intensives including IAVMs in Battle Creek, Michigan, USA in 2000 and 2001 and the Australasian Retreat for Advanced Volunteer Management conducted in Australia and New Zealand from 2005 to 2013.

Awards and honours 
Volunteering Matters was named charity of the year in September, 2015 at the European Diversity Awards (EDAs).

References

External links 
Charity Commission registry entry (number 291222)

Charities based in the United Kingdom
1962 establishments in the United Kingdom
Organizations established in 1962